Events in the year 1618 in Japan.

Incumbents
Monarch: Go-Mizunoo

Events
January 28 - Rules are established for the Ōoku, the section of Edo Castle that housed the Shōgun's consort and his concubines. (Traditional Japanese Date: Second Day of the First Month, 1618)

References

 
1610s in Japan
Japan
Years of the 17th century in Japan